In quantum information theory, the identity channel is a noise-free quantum channel. That is, the channel outputs exactly what was put in.

References

Information theory
Mathematical analysis